The 2001–02 Los Angeles Kings season was the Kings' 35th season in the National Hockey League.

Offseason

Regular season

The Kings tied the Red Wings for most power-play goals scored during the regular season, with 73, and had the best power-play percentage, at 20.68%.

All-Star game

The 52nd National Hockey League All-Star Game took place on February 2, 2002, at the Staples Center in Los Angeles, California. The final score was World 8, North America 5.

Season standings

Schedule and results

Playoffs 

In a rematch of the previous playoff season, Colorado defeated the Kings in the first round in seven games.

Round 1: Los Angeles vs. Colorado

Player statistics

Transactions
The Kings were involved in the following transactions during the 2001–02 season.

Trades

Free agent signings

Free agents lost

Waivers

Draft picks
Los Angeles's draft picks at the 2001 NHL Entry Draft held at the National Car Rental Center in Sunrise, Florida.

References
 Kings on Hockey Database

Los
Los
Los Angeles Kings seasons
National Hockey League All-Star Game hosts
LA Kings
LA Kings